Wahova, also spelled Vehova, is a Town and headquarter of Wahova Tehsil in Taunsa District of Punjab, Pakistan. Mostly Qaisrani Baloch tribe are settled here that is why it is also called Tuman Qaisrani. The languages spoken are mostly Saraiki and Balochi.

 It is located in south of Punjab at 31°7'58N 70°30'46E and has an elevation of 196 metres.

References

External links
 Satellite Images of Vehowa

Populated places in Taunsa District
Taunsa District